Womanhood is the nineteenth studio album by American country music singer-songwriter Tammy Wynette. It was released on July 24, 1978, by Epic Records.

Commercial performance 
The album peaked at No. 14 on the Billboard Country Albums chart. The album's first single, "I'd Like to See Jesus (On the Midnight Special)", peaked at No. 26 on the Billboard Country Singles chart, while the second single, "Womanhood", peaked at No. 3.

Track listing

Personnel
Adapted from the album liner notes.
Lou Bradley - engineer
Bill Justis - string arrangement
The Nashville Edition - backing vocals
Norman Seef - photography
Billy Sherrill - producer
Virginia Team - cover design
Tammy Wynette - lead vocals

Chart positions

Album

Singles

References

1978 albums
Tammy Wynette albums
Epic Records albums
Albums produced by Billy Sherrill